Westerplatte or Westerplatte Resists (Pl. Westerplatte broni się nadal) is a 1967 Polish historical film directed by Stanisław Różewicz. It was entered into the 5th Moscow International Film Festival where it won a Silver Prize.

The story is based upon the Battle of Westerplatte in September 1939.

Cast
 Zygmunt Hübner as Maj. Henryk Sucharski
 Arkadiusz Bazak as Capt. Franciszek Dąbrowski
 Tadeusz Schmidt as Ens. Jan Gryczman
 Józef Nowak as Cpl. Piotr Buder
 Tadeusz Pluciński as Cpl. Bronisław Grudziński
 Bogusz Bilewski as Capt. Mieczysław Slaby, Medical Officer
 Bohdan Ejmont as Mate Bernard Rygielski
 Mariusz Gorczynski as Pvt. Jan Czywil
 Zbigniew Józefowicz as Sgt. Kazimierz Rasiński, Radio Operator
 Jerzy Kaczmarek as Cpl. Władysław Baran
 Andrzej Kozak as Pvt. Eugeniusz Aniołek
 Andrzej Krasicki as Col. Karl Henke
 Adam Kwiatkowski as Cpl. Władysław Domoń
 Józef Lodynski as Sgt. Wojciech Najsarek, Station-Master
 Mieczyslaw Milecki as Lt. Stefan Grodecki
 Janusz Mirczewski as Cpl. Franciszek Magdziarz

References

External links
 

1967 films
1960s historical drama films
1960s war drama films
Polish historical drama films
Polish war drama films
1960s Polish-language films
World War II films based on actual events
Siege films
1967 drama films
Polish World War II films
Films scored by Wojciech Kilar